Evgeny Dobrenko (born 4 April 1962) is a Russian-American historian. Born in Odessa, he moved to Moscow and worked at Moscow State University and the Russian State University of Humanities. He emigrated to the US and worked at Duke University, Stanford University, UC Irvine, Amherst College and NYU. He then moved to the UK, and worked at universities in Nottingham and Sheffield. He is now professor of Russian studies at the Ca' Foscari University of Venice.

His lifelong area of academic interest has been Stalinist culture. He was awarded the Efim Etkind Prize for the best book about Russian Culture in 2012 and the AATSEEL Award for Outstanding Contributions to Scholarship in 2019. His book Late Stalinism was nominated for the Pushkin House Book Prize.

Works
 State Laughter: Stalinism, Populism, and Origins of Soviet Culture
 Late Stalinism: The Aesthetics of Politics
 "It's Just Letters on Paper…" Vladimir Sorokin: After Literature
 Socialist Realism in Central and Eastern European Literatures under Stalin: Institutions, Dynamics, Discourses
 Russian literature since 1991
 A History of Russian Literary Theory and Criticism: The Soviet Age and Beyond
 The Cambridge Companion to Twentieth-Century Russian Literature
 Noncanonical Classic: Dmitry Aleksandrovich Prigov
 Petrified Utopia: Happiness Soviet Style
 Stalinist Cinema and the Production of History: Museum of the Revolution
 Political Economy of Socialist Realism
 Soviet Culture and Power A History in Documents, 1917–1953
 Aesthetics of Alienation: Reassessment of Early Soviet Cultural Theories
 Russian Literary Criticism: 1917–1932
 The Landscape of Stalinism: The Art and Ideology of Soviet Space
 Soviet Riches: Essays on Culture, Literature and Film
 The Making of the State Writer: Social and Aesthetic Origins of Soviet Literary Culture
 Socialist Realist Canon
 Endquote: Sots-Art Literature and Soviet Grand Style
 The Making of the State Reader: Social and Aesthetic Contexts of the Reception of Soviet Literature
 Socialist Realism without Shores
 Metaphor of Power: Literature of the Stalin Era in Historical Context
 Isaac Babel's Red Cavalry
 Ridding Ourselves of Mirages. Socialist Realism Today

References

Russian emigrants to the United Kingdom
Living people
20th-century Russian historians
Academics of the University of Sheffield
1962 births